

The Avia 156 was a 1930s Czechoslovakian six-passenger commercial transport airliner for both mail and passengers, designed by Robert Nebesář and built by Avia. The type performed well but only one was built.

Development
The Avia 156 was a single-engined high-wing cantilever monoplane that first flew in 1934. Powered by a Hispano-Suiza 12Ydrs inline piston engine, it had fixed tailwheel landing gear.

Specifications

References

Notes

Bibliography

1930s Czechoslovakian airliners
Single-engined tractor aircraft
High-wing aircraft
Aircraft first flown in 1934
156